

Overview 
Marguerite Ross Barnett (May 21, 1942 – February 26, 1992) was the eighth president of the University of Houston and a former chancellor of the University of Missouri–St. Louis.  Barnett was the first African American woman to lead a major American university.
 
Barnett was born in Charlottesville, Virginia. She grew up in Buffalo, New York, and graduated from Bennett High School in 1959. After graduating from Antioch College in 1964, she earned a master's degree in political science and Ph.D. in political science from the University of Chicago.  Barnett then taught at the University of Chicago, Princeton University, Howard University, and Columbia University.

She was vice-chancellor for academic affairs at the City University of New York from 1983 to 1986, and chancellor of the University of Missouri-St. Louis, from 1986 to 1990. Dr. Barnett then became the president of the University of Houston, from 1990 to 1992. Dr. Barnett's term came to an end on February 26, 1992, she tragically died of cancer. Additionally, she served on the boards of the Monsanto Company, the Educational Testing Services, the Student Loan Marketing Association (SALLIE MAE), the American Council on Education, and the Committee on Economic Development. She also served on the board of directors of the Houston Grand Opera and the board of advisors of the Houston Symphony.

Education 
Dr. Barnett received her bachelor's degree in political science in 1964 from Antioch College, It was here where she found her love for Indian politics. She then went on to receive her master's degree in 1969 and her Ph.D. in 1972 from the University of Chicago. During her Ph.D. she traveled abroad to India to do research for her dissertation. Dr. Barnett's focus was African American studies and Indian politics. While receiving her Ph.D. she also taught a political science course in 1969 and taught a lecture course in 1970. This was very uncommon in the 1960s for a major University to allow African American women to teach courses while receiving their Ph.D.

Career 
Once Dr. Barnett received her Ph.D., she began her teaching career at Princeton University. She was an assistant professor at Princeton University between the years 1970–1976. During her time at Princeton, Dr. Barnett turned her dissertation into a book that she completed in 1976. Her book The Politics of Cultural Nationalism in South India won the Political Science Associations Ethnic and Cultural Pluralism award in 1981, which was published by Princeton University Press. After her six-year stint at Princeton University, Dr. Barnett began to teach at Howard University, One of the most known HBCUs in the country. During her four years at Howard, she taught political science while also serving as chair of her department between 1977 and 1980. She also helped create the Ethnic Heritage project which studied the history of African Americans in Gum Springs, Virginia. After her four years at Howard University, she decided to take another teaching position at Columbia University.  Dr. Barnett was a professor at Columbia University where she taught political science and education from 1980 to 1983. She also served as a director of the institute for minority and urban education.

Once she left Columbia University, she would now shift completely from the classroom to the administration side of the university. She became vice-chancellor of academic affairs at the City University of New York. from 1982 to 1983 she was co-principal investigator on the Constitution and American Culture and the training program for special project directors, sponsored by the National Endowment for the Humanities. She worked as vice chancellor for three years until she received a job offer from the University of Missouri–St. Louis where she would become chancellor. Dr. Barnett was chancellor at the University of Missouri- St Louis between 1986 and 1990. She created the Bridge program whose goal was to help students who were finically struggling in public school to receive a better education, it also focused on the “bridge” between high school and college students, especially in the science and mathematics department. She won the Anderson Medal award for this program. She also initiated seven new Ph.D./master's degree programs within different departments. Dr. Barnett doubled the amount of federal research and service grant dollars received within her first year as chancellor. She did such a great job at the UMST that the New York Times credited her with “taking a sleepy campus and turning it around”.

On September 1, 1990, Dr. Barnett became the first-ever African American women president at a major university with more than 30,000 students. She became president of the University of Houston. On her first official meeting on September 4, 1990, she laid out seven major challenges that the University of Houston faced which she would try to correct. She wanted to focus on the movement of the campus toward the goal of enhanced national and international stature, maintenance of quality undergraduate instruction, community service/ community outreach, resources, diversity, democratization at the University of Houston, and quality of our environment. Dr. Barnett had three overarching principles which she believed should guide campus policy, a commitment to excellence, to partner with the Houston community, and to a humane campus community.

Under her leadership a multitude of programs were created, the first being the Texas Center for University-School Partnership. Her first public address is when she named the plans for this program. The Texas center for University-School Partnership is an outreach program designed to assess national school reform efforts and disseminate the results of the successful programs across the country. In the programs first year 37 universities joined, from colleges in New York to colleges in California. She also created the Texas Center for Environmental Studies in 1991. The purpose was to address the multidisciplinary concerns for the nation's environmental needs through research, education service activities in history, law, engineering, science, business, and communications. Another very notable program was the Friends of the University of Houston which was to assist in telling the story of the university to the Houston community. This program was considered the first of its kind, due to the fact that the University of Houston public history program hade just been created in 1984.

Dr. Barnett also focused on the diversity aspect of the university as well. She addressed this during the Black Alumni Association annual meeting in the fall of 1990. She believed that diversity was a major issue in all programs, and we should make it a priority and not let it occur “naturally”. She appointed Dr.Elwyn Lee over the African American studies program with help from Dr. Elizabeth brown- Guillory. Dr. Mindiola was over the Mexican American studies program, he helped the Houston Mexican American community integrate with Hispanic students. Dr. Barnett tried to implement five major ideas when dealing with diversity, a business and professional leaders mentor program where alumni and corporate ladders would work as partners with the university to mentor individual students from disadvantaged and minority backgrounds, a university consortium to encourage minority students to seek graduate degrees and to provide positions for graduates of that program, a faculty mentorship program for new minority faculty members, a university-wide week celebrating diversity each year through student and academic programs, a student and faculty volunteer program bringing University of Houston faculty and students into lower-income schools, and neighborhoods to work with disadvantaged youth.

During her time at the University of Houston, Dr. Barnett raised over 350 million dollars in funds in less than two years. Dr. Barnett received the largest donation in not only the University of Houston's history but any public university at the time. The donation was 51.4 million from the John and Rebecca Moore.
	
Dr. Barnett is widely known for the Bridge program and the Texas Center for University-School Partnership, but she focused on many different programs throughout her professional career. She served on the board for the Monsanto Company, the Educational testing service, the National student loan marketing association, the Houston Grand Opera, the board of advisors of the Houston Symphony, the American Council on Education, the Board of Union Electric, the St Louis Symphony, the St Louis Arts and Education Council,  the and St Louis Civic. She was also appointed President's Commission on Environmental Quality by George H. W. Bush Dr. Barnett was also a member of professional associations in political science, South Asian studies, the Overseas Development Council, the Council on Foreign Relations, and the Cleaved council. She was the trustee of the committee on Economic Development.

Awards Won 

List of awards Dr. Barnett received from 1964 to 1990.

Samuel Stouffer Fellowship (1964)

National opinion research center fellowship(1965)

Committee on Southern Asian studies fellowship (1966)

Committee for the study of comparative politics fellowship (1967)

Princeton University faculty research grant (1970)

James Madison Bicentennial preceptor at Princeton University 
Distinguished Research and scholarship (1976)

American Political Science Association ethnic and cultural pluralism award for best scholarly work in political science (Best book) (1981)

Bethune-Tubman-Truth Women of the Year Award (1983)

Association of Black Women in Higher Education Award for Educational Excellence (1986)

American Political Science COBPS Award for Excellence in Scholarship and Service to the Profession (1986)

Golden GAZELLE Award from the Project on Equal Education of the NOW Legal Defense Fund (1987)

Award of Achievement, Jefferson City NAACP (1988)

The St. Louis Variety Club named Barnett Woman of the Year (1989)

The Women's International Leadership Forum presented her with the Woman Who Has Made a Difference Award (1990)

Legacy 
Dr. Barnett is the first African American woman to become president at a major institution with over 30,000 students. The first African American female president at a college Institution was Willa Beatrice Player and the first African American president at an ivy league institution was Ruth Simmons. All three of these women achieved major milestones for not only themselves but for the African American community as well. They broke barriers for African American women, in a study done by two students at the University of Nebraska–Lincoln, there have been over forty female African American college presidents between 1992 and 2002. Prior to this there were only twenty-three African American female college presidents between 1900 and 1991.

Dr. Barnett fell ill with hypoglycemia cancer which caused her to take a leave of absence in January 1992. She traveled to Wailuku, Hawaii during her leave. Dr. Barnett died on Wednesday, February 26, 1992. On The day of her passing the University of Houston released two statements. The first statement written by Chancellor Alexander F. Schilt praised Dr. Barnett for the resources, habits, and programs that she created that would benefit the future of the university. The second statement written by James H Pickering (Acting President) addressed Dr. Barnett's vision for the university and her impact while also mentioning that on that upcoming Sunday, March 1 at 3:00 p.m. a memorial service will be held at Cullen Performance Hall. George H. W. Bush wrote to her husband “Marguerite was a dedicated servant to the University of Houston, to her community, and to her country. She was very special, and she will be missed”, King would share these words at her memorial in front of Cullen Hall.

Dr. Barnett will be remembered for a multitude of her achievements. At UMSL she has a scholarship named after her whose goal is to help students who are in the Bridge program receive their graduate degrees. Also, At UMSL the Bridge program is still performing at a very high level. Although this is the only program that Is still active, she was a pioneer in how the University of Houston would become one of the most diverse universities in the nation. It is currently ranked third in the state of Texas. Dr. Barnett has two plaques in her memory, one is at the University of Houston near Cullen Hall, and the other is located at University of Missouri St-Louis.

References

Presidents of the University of Houston
Antioch College alumni
University of Chicago alumni
University of Chicago faculty
Princeton University faculty
Howard University faculty
Columbia University faculty
1942 births
1992 deaths
20th-century American academics